Mesosa latifasciata is a species of beetle in the family Cerambycidae. It was described by White in 1858, originally under the genus Cacia. It is known from Taiwan, Vietnam and China.

References

latifasciata
Beetles described in 1858